Neckeropsis pocsii is a species of moss in the family Neckeraceae. It is endemic to Comoros.  Its natural habitat is subtropical or tropical dry forests. It is threatened by habitat loss.

References

pocsii
Endemic flora of the Comoros
Critically endangered flora of Africa
Taxonomy articles created by Polbot